Go, Dog. Go! is an educational computer animated children's streaming television series based on the 1961 children's book of the same name by P. D. Eastman, which was developed for Netflix by Adam Peltzman.

Co-produced by DreamWorks Animation Television and WildBrain Studios, the series premiered on January 26, 2021. A second season was released on December 7, 2021. A third season was released on September 19, 2022. A fourth season is set to be released in 2023.

Premise
The series revolves around the lifestyle of two young canines, Tag Barker and Scooch Pooch, in their canine town of Pawston.

Characters

Main characters 
 Tag Barker (voiced by Michela Luci; Maisie Marsh in the UK dub) a 6-year-old orange dog resembling a Beagador. Tag is the only dog to appear in all episodes and segments, and is very energetic and open. She is skilled at making inventions.
 Scooch Pooch (voiced by Callum Shoniker; Toby Fullman in the UK dub) a 6-year-old small blue dog resembling a Terrier. Scooch is a new neighbor in the town of Pawston (as he has moved in from a farm), and he is more shy and reserved compared to Tag. He's Tag's best friend and neighbor.
 Ma Barker (voiced by Katie Griffin; Petra Letang in the UK dub) a lavender dog resembling a Beagador. She is one of the Pawston blimp pilots, and is the mother of Tag, Cheddar Biscuit, Gilber, Spike and Yip Barker.
 Paw Barker (voiced by Martin Roach; Jude Owusu in the UK dub) a brown dog resembling a Beagador. He owns and runs the Ding Dong Doorbell store, and is the father of Tag, Cheddar Biscuit, Gilber, Spike and Yip Barker.
 Cheddar Biscuit (voiced by Tajja Isen; Hannah Hutch in the UK dub) a 7-year-old white polka-dotted dog resembling a Beagador. She is a clown and loves performing for people, and is the sister of Tag, Gilber, Spike and Yip Barker.  She's very supportive of Tag but often gets competitive with her.  Gilber often performs with her on her acts.
 Spike Barker (voiced by Lyon Smith) a red dog resembling a Beagador. Spike left the Race Cadets to join the Space Cadets, and is the brother of Tag, Cheddar Biscuit, Gilber and Yip Barker. He's very athletic and likes sports.
 Gilber Barker (voiced by Lyon Smith; James Cartmell in the UK dub) a yellow dog resembling a Beagador, and is the schemer of the Barkers, and Tag's frenemy. He is the brother of Tag, Cheddar Biscuit, Spike and Yip Barker.  He often works alongside Cheddar Biscuit whenever she's performing or competing against Tag.
 Grandma Marge Barker (voiced by Judy Marshank; Victoria Strachan in the UK dub) a purple dog resembling a Beagador. She is the Barker family matriarch, and is the grandmother of Tag, Cheddar Biscuit, Gilber, Spike and Yip Barker. Both Marge and Mort run a repair shop in Pawston.
 Grandpaw Mort Barker (voiced by Patrick McKenna; Laurie Jamieson in the UK dub) a beige dog resembling a Beagle crossed with a Basset hound. He runs a repair shop with Marge, and is the grandfather of Tag, Cheddar Biscuit, Gilber, Spike and Yip Barker.
 Yip Barker (voiced by Diane Salemi) a purple puppy resembling a Beagador. He is the brother of Tag, Cheddar Biscuit, Spike and Gilber Barker.
 Sgt Pooch (voiced by Linda Ballantyne) a blue dog resembling a Terrier who is Scooch's mother and a police officer in Pawston.

Supporting characters 
 Frank (voiced by David Berni; Adam Diggle in the UK dub) a yellow bespectacled dog resembling a cross between a Beagle and a Dachshund and one of Tag's rivals. Frank is always scheming for selfish ends, and is the brains of the duo between him and Beans.
 Beans (voiced by Anand Rajaram; Shubham Saraf in the UK dub) a large green dog resembling an Old English Sheepdog in an aviator's flight cap and one of Tag's rivals/frenemy. Beans is idiotic but kind-hearted, and often serves as the muscle to Frank's schemes.
 Lady Lydia (voiced by Linda Ballantyne) a rose-colored Poodle who is famous in Pawston for having the most hats of any dog in town.
 Gerald (voiced by Patrick McKenna) a teal dog resembling a cross between a Terrier and a Great Dane. Gerald is one of Pawston's more recent arrivals, and works in the town delivering mail.
 Muttfield (voiced by Patrick McKenna) a purple dog resembling a cross between a Beagador and a Bulldog. He is a famous magician in Pawston.
 Manhole Dog (voiced by Patrick McKenna) a beige dog resembling a Beagle crossed with a Basset hound and a French Bulldog. As his name suggests, Manhole Dog is often seen peeking out of manholes all over Pawston, and he also wears a manhole cover on his head. He is also secretly Master Wag, a master of the art known as "Tail-kwondo".
 Mayor Sniffington (voiced by Linda Ballantyne) a purple dog resembling a cross between a Beagador and a pug who is the mayor of Pawston.
 Sam Whippet (voiced by Joshua Graham) a blue dog resembling a Greyhound. Whippet is a Pawston celebrity, having several undefeated streaks in the race course. Tag idolizes him.
 The Barkapellas a trio of dogs who sing harmonically instead of speaking. A three feature mohawks and wear ties, shirt collars and suit cuffs.
 Tenor (voiced by Paul Buckley) the tall orange male of the Barkapellas.
 Bass (voiced by Reno Selmser) the short purple male of the Barkapellas.
 Alto (voiced by Zoe D'Andrea) the medium-sized cyan female of the Barkapellas.
 Beefsteak (voiced by Tajja Isen) a strong pink dog resembling a Chihuahua. She is an exercise coach at the Ruff and Tumble Gym.
 Wind Swiftly (voiced by Ava Preston) a purple dog.
 Tread Lightly a teal dog.
 Doug a yellow dog.
 Wagnes (voiced by Judy Marshank) a blue dog who works at the Big Bowl Diner.
 Hambonio a red hairdresser dog.
 Big Dog (voiced by Matthew Mucci) a large white dog with large grey ears, who’s friends with Little Dog.
 Little Dog (voiced by Hattie Kragten) a small purple dog, who’s friends with Big Dog.
 Coach Chewman (voiced by Phill Williams) a red dog.
 Gabe Roof (voiced by Phill Williams) a yellow dog.
 Waggs Martinez (voiced by Linda Ballantyne) a purple dog.
 Flip Chasely (voiced by Anand Rajaram) a brown dog.
 Catch Morely (voiced by Julie Lemieux) a blue dog.
 Donny Slippers (voiced by Jamie Watson) a red dog.
 Bernard Rubber (voiced by Joshua Graham) a little teal dog.
 Kit Whiskerton (voiced by Zarina Rocha) a purple cat who is Tom's daughter and a friend of Tag and Scooch.

Others 
 Fetcher (voiced by Deven Mack) a teal dog resembling a cross between a Beagle, a Poodle, and a Labrador retriever. Fetcher has been stranded on Ball Island ever since he was a pup after he chased after his favorite ball.
 Kelly Korgi (voiced by Stacey Kay) a peach-colored dog who resembles a cross between a corgi and a shiba inu. Korgi is a well-renowned singer and popstar amongst the citizens of Pawston, and her music is very excitedly received.
 Leo Howlstead (voiced by John Stocker) an elderly grey dog who resembles a cross between Great Dane, a husky, and a German Shepherd. Leo lives in a Senior Center and used to be a row cadet, and unlike the vast majority of his fellow seniors is very active.
 Yellow (voiced by Danny Smith) a generic yellow dog resembling a beagador. He is often seen at the amusement park target stands, and awards winners with their prizes in a deadpan manner.
 Sandra Paws (voiced by Deann DeGruijter) a large icy blue dog.
 Taylee (voiced by Manvi Thapar) a teal puppy.
 Rhonda (voiced by Diane Salemi) a light blue puppy.
 Chili (voiced by Anand Rajaram) a large red dog resembling an Old English Sheepdog. He's Beans's cousin.
 Franny a brown puppy.
 Franny's Mom (voiced by Tajja Isen) a mint green dog.
 Franny's Dad (voiced by Joshua Graham) a blue dog.
 Bowser (voiced by Anand Rajaram) a blue dog.
 Cam Snapshot a pink dog.
 Early Ed (voiced by Robert Tinkler) a green dog.
 Jerry a brown dog.
 Onlooker Dog (voiced by Anand Rajaram) a yellow dog.
 Brutus (voiced by Patrick McKenna) a blue dog who is Kelly Korgi's bodyguard.
 Marcus Worms (voiced by David Berni) a pink dog.
 Truck Driver (voiced by Joshua Graham) a green dog.
 Tom Whiskerton (voiced by Paul Braunstein) a grey cat and Kit's father who is a firefighter from Meowburquerque.
 Darrell a blue dog who is Muttfield's assistant.
 Dale Mation a dalmatian who is the firefighter of Pawston.
 Sandwich Dog (voiced by Patrick McKenna) a purple dog.
 Waggles a pink clown dog.
 Bowowzo & Wowbowzo a double of purple clown dogs.
 Boingos a teal clown dog.
 Soppy a blue clown dog.
 Struggles a blue clown dog.
 The Cannon Triplets a trio of yellow clown dogs.

Episodes

Season 1 (2021)

Season 2 (2021)

Season 3 (2022)

Production
The series was first announced back in 2019 as part of seven Netflix Original Preschool shows targeted at 2-6 year olds. It was originally going to be released late 2020, but was delayed until January the following year. The first and second season consists of nine episodes with the third season of eight episodes, each 24 minutes in length. All episodes featured 2 11-12 minute stories, though episodes 6, 9 and 18 are 2-parters and episode 10 is a full length episode.

Music 
The series was composed by Paul Buckley.

Release
Go, Dog. Go! premiered on January 26, 2021, globally on Netflix. A trailer was released on January 6, along with an array of teaser clips released by different publications.

Reception

Critical reception
The review, which is from Common Sense Media, gives the series 4 out of 5 stars, and the disclaimer: "Dog adventures with oodles of preschool laughs."

Accolades

References

External links

2021 American television series debuts
2021 Canadian television series debuts
2020s American animated television series
2020s American children's comedy television series
2020s Canadian animated television series
2020s Canadian children's television series
2020s preschool education television series
American children's animated comedy television series
American computer-animated television series
American preschool education television series
American television shows based on children's books
Animated series based on books
Animated television series about dogs
Canadian children's animated comedy television series
Canadian computer-animated television series
Canadian preschool education television series
Canadian television shows based on children's books
Animated preschool education television series
English-language Netflix original programming
Netflix children's programming
Television series by DHX Media
Television series by DreamWorks Animation